The Samson is an English-built railroad steam locomotive made in 1838 that ran on the Albion Mines Railway in Nova Scotia, Canada. It is preserved at the Nova Scotia Museum of Industry in Stellarton, Nova Scotia and is the oldest locomotive in Canada.

Construction
The locomotive was built in 1838 by Timothy Hackworth at his Soho Works in Durham, England. Samson represents an early design of steam locomotive with a return-flue boiler. The fireman and engineer worked separately on open platforms at either end of the locomotive. It was commissioned for the General Mining Association along with two other locomotives, Hercules and John Buddle, for the Albion Mines Railway to serve mines in Pictou County, Nova Scotia.

Arrival
The locomotives arrived unassembled aboard the brig Ythan in May 1839. Two engineers arrived with the locomotives (the Samson, the John Buddle and the Hercules), including George Davidson, who helped build the locomotives in England and would settle in Nova Scotia to work with Samson for the rest of his career. Also accompanying the locomotives on the journey was John Brown Stubbs (Stobbs), Hackworth's master mechanic. He too helped build the locomotives and when the job was complete, he returned to Hackworth's employ in England. The new railway officially opened with a large celebration on 19 September 1839, although the tracks were not actually completed to the coal pier until May 1840.

Career
Samson served from 1839 to 1867 carrying coal on the six-mile line from the mines around Stellarton and New Glasgow to the East River loading pier. It proved a strong and reliable locomotive, considered "slow but of great power" by railway workers of the day. One former engineer recalled how it moved a heavy string of coal cars from a crooked siding on a wet day when a more modern locomotive failed to move them. In addition to its regular duties moving coal cars, Samson also saw service carrying  passengers in an early design of a passenger coach. The locomotive was semi-retired in 1867 but continued to operate when necessary until 1885. It was sent to Chicago to the National Exhibition of Railway Appliances in 1883.

Preservation

Samson languished on a scrapline until 1893 when it was displayed at the Chicago World’s Fair as an antique, and acquired along with one of its passenger coaches by the Baltimore & Ohio Railroad where it was preserved. In 1927 Samson was returned to Nova Scotia. The passenger coach stayed behind and may be seen today at the B&O Railroad Museum. Samson was displayed beside the Halifax train station until 1950 when the locomotive was moved to New Glasgow. Today it is displayed in the Age of Steam Gallery at the Nova Scotia Museum of Industry in  Stellarton, part of the Nova Scotia Museum system where it is restored to its appearance at the end of its working life. A careful survey of the structure of the locomotive before restoration found it remarkably well preserved, retaining 90% of its end of service parts. Examination of the parts show various repairs and evolutionary modifications which were added to the original Hackworth assembly by the shops of the Albion Mines Railway during the locomotive's long working career. A small number of parts such as the steel tires were added by the B & O railroad museum after the locomotive retired.

Significance
Samson was the first locomotive in Canada to run on iron rails. It is the oldest surviving locomotive in Canada, one of the oldest in North America and one of only three surviving locomotives designed by engineer Timothy Hackworth (the others being Derwent and Sans Pareil).

See also

John Bull (locomotive)
LMR 57 Lion
Stourbridge Lion
Timothy Hackworth

References

Shirley Woods, Cinders & Saltwater: The Story of Atlantic Canada's Railways Nimbus Publishing, Halifax (1992), pages 12–13.

External links

Early Images of Samson, Pictou-Antigonish Regional Library
Samson, Nova Scotia Museum of Industry
Nova Scotia Railway Heritage Society, Samson location information

Samson
0-6-0 locomotives
Early steam locomotives
Rail transport in Nova Scotia
Transport in Pictou County
Steam locomotives of Canada
Preserved steam locomotives of Canada
Albion Mines Railway
1838 establishments in England
Timothy Hackworth